Ranney Bridge is a historic Pratt Pony Truss Bridge over the Ausable River at Keene Valley in Essex County, New York.  It was built in 1902 and was built by the Canton Iron Bridge Company.  It was originally located at the hamlet of New Russia and moved to its present site about 1925.  It is 15 feet, 9 inches wide and spans 59 feet, 9 inches at roughly 7 feet, 4 inches above water level.

It was listed on the National Register of Historic Places in 1999.

References

Road bridges on the National Register of Historic Places in New York (state)
Bridges completed in 1902
Bridges in Essex County, New York
National Register of Historic Places in Essex County, New York
Pratt truss bridges in the United States
Metal bridges in the United States